David Mark Andriole (born March 16, 1964) is an American actor. He had a recurring role as Officer Spencer in NBC's soap opera Sunset Beach.

References

External links

American male soap opera actors
Living people
1964 births
American expatriate male actors in the United Kingdom
American male film actors
American male television actors